Waterbury Public Schools is a school district based in Waterbury, Connecticut.

The district serves over 18,000 students. Waterbury is notable as the first school district in Connecticut to establish a dress code for all students. Waterbury Public Schools operates under the leadership of superintendent Dr. Verna D. Ruffin and a Board of Education that consists of 10 elected members and the City Mayor.

Waterbury's 1,500 teachers work in 30 schools and educational programs. They belong to the Waterbury Teachers' Association.

History
Waterbury's first public high school opened in 1851...

District Reference Group I
Waterbury is one of the seven public school systems in District Reference Group I, a classification made by the state Department of Education for the purpose of comparison with the achievement levels of similar schools. District reference groups are defined as "districts whose students' families are similar in education, income, occupation and need, and that have roughly similar enrollment". The other six school districts in the group are Bridgeport, Hartford, New Britain, New Haven, New London, and Windham.

Schools

High schools
 Crosby High School
 John F. Kennedy High School
 Wilby High School
 Waterbury Arts Magnet School
 Waterbury Career Academy

Intermediate/Middle schools
 North End Middle School
 Wallace Middle School
 Waterbury Arts Magnet School
 West Side Middle School
WAMS

Elementary schools
 Bucks Hill Elementary School
 Bunker Hill Elementary School 
 B.W. Tinker Elementary School
 Carrington Elementary School
 Chase Elementary School
 Wendell Cross Elementary School
 Driggs Elementary School
 Duggan Elementary School
 F.J. Kingsbury Elementary School
 Generali Elementary School
 Hopeville Elementary School
 John G. Gilmartin Elementary School
 Maloney Magnet Elementary School
 Reed Elementary School
 Regan Elementary School
 Rotella Interdistrict Magnet School
 Sprague Elementary School
 Walsh Elementary School
 Washington Elementary School
 Woodrow Wilson Elementary School
 Rotella Magnet School

External links
 Waterbury Public Schools
 Waterbury Public Schools Addresses, Phone Numbers, and Websites
 Strategic School Profile 2004-05 - Waterbury Public School District (PDF file)
 Waterbury American Graffiti: The Crosby High School Class of 1959

References

 The History of Public Education in Connecticut
 "Metro Briefing - Connecticut: Waterbury: Dress Code Affirmed", The New York Times, November 20, 2001, retrieved May 2, 2006
 "Waterbury board of ed warns students: Keep toes covered", Connecticut Conference of Municipalities Municipal Innovations News, November 30, 2004, retrieved May 2, 2006

Education in New Haven County, Connecticut
School districts in Connecticut
Waterbury, Connecticut